Mona von Bismarck (née Strader; February 5, 1897 – July 10, 1983), also known as Mona Bismarck, was an American socialite, fashion icon, and philanthropist. Her five husbands included Harrison Williams, among the richest men in America, and Count Albrecht Eduard "Eddie" von Bismarck-Schönhausen, a grandson of German Chancellor Otto von Bismarck. She was the first American to be named "The Best Dressed Woman in the World" by a panel of top couturiers, including Coco Chanel, and she was also named to the International Best Dressed List Hall of Fame.

Early life
She was born as Mona Strader in Louisville, Kentucky, in 1897 to Robert Sims Strader and his wife, Bird O'Shockeny. Her parents divorced in 1902, and Mona and her brother were raised in Lexington, Kentucky, by their paternal grandmother.

Through their mother, Patricia Strader, Mona was the great-aunt to automobile racers David "Salt" Walther and George "Skipp" Walther III.

Marriages
In 1917, she married Henry J. Schlesinger, a man 18 years her senior who owned Fairland Farm in Lexington, where her father was a professional trainer, and moved to Milwaukee, where he had an iron and coke business. During the marriage, Mona bore a son, Robert Henry, whom she left in the custody of Schlesinger in exchange for half a million dollars when they divorced in 1920. (Her son would marry Frederica Barker, elder sister of actor Lex Barker.) In 1921, she married banker James Irving Bush, 14 years her senior, said to be the "handsomest man in America". They divorced in Paris in 1925.

In 1926, Mona opened a New York dress shop with her friend Laura Merriam Curtis, the daughter of William Rush “Spooky” Merriam, a former governor of Minnesota. At the time, Laura had been previously engaged to Harrison Williams, said to be the richest man in America, with an estimated fortune of $600 million ($ in today dollars; $37,500,000,000 in gold-dollars (at $1275/tr.oz)), made in financing public utilities. On July 2, 1926, Mona married Williams, a widower 24 years her senior.
For their honeymoon, they went on a cruise around the world on Williams' Warrior, at the time, the largest, most expensive pleasure boat in the world.

When they returned from their honeymoon, Williams bought the Georgian mansion at the corner of 94th Street and Fifth Avenue designed by Delano and Aldrich in 1915 for Willard Straight. Mona had it decorated by Syrie Maugham. They also kept an estate named Oak Point on Bayville Avenue, Bayville, Long Island, for which Delano and Aldrich also did alterations. They kept a home on North Ocean Avenue in Palm Beach, and the villa Il Fortino overlooking Capri's Marina Grande, on land which belonged first to Caesar Augustus, and later to the Emperor Tiberius.

In 1933, Mona was named "The Best Dressed Woman in the World" by Chanel, Molyneux, Vionnet, Lelong, and Lanvin, becoming the first American to be so honored. The Duchess of Windsor (1934) and Elsie de Wolfe (1935)  also earned that title. She was named to the International Best Dressed List Hall of Fame in 1958.

In Ridin' High (1936), Cole Porter had Ethel Merman sing: "What do I care if Mrs. Harrison Williams is the best dressed woman in town?" In 1943, Mona's portrait was painted by Salvador Dalí.

Williams died in 1953, and in January 1955, Mona married her "secretary" Albrecht Edzard Heinrich Karl, Graf von Bismarck-Schönhausen (1903–1970), an "interior decorator" of an aristocratic sort and the son of Herbert von Bismarck and grandson of  German Chancellor Otto von Bismarck, civilly in New Jersey, and in February 1956, religiously in Rome. They lived mostly in Paris at an apartment in the famed Hôtel Lambert, later at Mona's townhouse at 34 avenue de New York, and at Capri.

In 1970, Mona was widowed again, and in 1971, married Bismarck's physician, "Count" Umberto de Martini, a nobleman (after Mona acquired a title for him from King Umberto II of Italy), who was 14 years younger than she. Only after his death in a sports car accident in 1979 (later referenced by socialites as "Martini on the rocks") did Mona realize that Martini, like Bismarck, had married her for her money (exactly the same way she had married Schlesinger, Bush, and Williams, so many years before). Martini turned out to be already married and had been secretly bilking Mona of funds for his children.

When Cristóbal Balenciaga closed his atelier in 1968, Diana Vreeland quipped that Mona did not leave her bedroom in the villa at Capri for three days. 
Mona donated her papers and photos to the Filson Historical Society in 1976, and several items of unique jewelry to the Smithsonian Institution, including the Bismarck Sapphire Necklace.

In Truman Capote's Answered Prayers (1987), she was the model for the character Kate McCloud.

Later life and death
Mona was one of the most revered and celebrated socialites of her day. Counting many of the most influential and well-known personalities of the time amongst her friends, and having risen far above her humble beginnings, Mona never forgot her native Kentucky. In 1976, this led her to donate her papers and photographs to the Filson Historical Society. The Mona Strader Bismarck Papers span 1916–1994 and are primarily made up of personal correspondence. Most of the letters were written by members of the social world in which Mona lived. They include her close friends, the Duchess of Windsor, Diana Vreeland, Gore Vidal, Randolph Churchill, Constantin Alajalov (cover illustrator for The New Yorker and the Saturday Evening Post), jewelry designer Jean Schlumberger, Hubert de Givenchy, and Cecil Beaton, among many others.

After a life in the social spotlight at the centre of café society, Mona eventually retired from the social scene, splitting her time between her Paris townhouse and her villa "Il Fortino" in Capri. An avid gardener, Mona cultivated beautiful ornamental gardens within her villa's grounds, having fresh water brought in from the mainland daily to sustain it.

Towards the end of her life, and with her eyesight beginning to fail, Mona spent her final years putting her affairs in order, dispatching her papers, paintings and other precious items from her collection to various museums and cultural societies.

Mona died in 1983 at the age of 86. She was buried in a Givenchy gown and rests with her third and fourth husbands, Harrison Williams and Eddie Von Bismarck, in Locust Valley Cemetery, on Long Island.

Mona left instruction in her will for her remaining fortune, plus the proceeds from the sale of her estates to establish a part of her legacy, which still remains today, the Mona Bismarck American Center for Art and Culture in Paris. Upon Mona's instruction, the organisation (still headquartered at her Paris townhouse) sustains and fosters artistic and cultural Franco-American relations.

References

Further reading
Birchfield, James. Kentucky Countess:  Mona Bismarck in Art and Fashion. Lexington:  University of Kentucky Art Museum, 1997.
Tapert, Annette & Edkins, Diana, The Power of Style - The Women Who Defined The Art of Living Well, Crown Publishers, New York, 1994.

External links
 The Mona Bismarck American Center for art & culture
 Mona Strader Bismarck Collection, The Filson Newsmagazine
 Mrs. Williams' Husband, Time, March 8, 1937 

1897 births
1983 deaths
Mona
American socialites
Burials at Locust Valley Cemetery
German countesses
People from Louisville, Kentucky
People from Lexington, Kentucky
People from Bayville, New York
Female models from Kentucky
20th-century American women